Reis Sedat Peker (born 26 June 1971) is a Turkish mafia boss and whistle-blower who has made various allegations about Turkish politicians and numerous government engagements in illegal activities through his own YouTube channel. He has described himself as a Pan-Turkist and Turanist.

Life
Sedat was born in Adapazarı, in the Turkish province of Sakarya. He spent considerable time in Germany. In a 1999 interview with Milliyet he self-identified as a Pan-Turkist and Turanist.

Peker was tried in 1997 for the murder of the drug smuggler Abdullah Topçu, but acquitted. The two other defendants in the same case, alleged to be Peker's employees, were sentenced to life imprisonment.

After this, he fled to Romania and was sought for, amongst others, protection racketeering, coercion, and incitement to murder. During this time it was reported that Peker had been visited by a minister and a member of parliament from the Motherland Party and guaranteed, in return for an unknown favor, to be only imprisoned for a short period of time. as 2022 Sedat Peker revealed that favour that secured his release was turning in a cassete footage of then PM Mesut Yılmaz being beaten up in Hungary because of his gambling debts 

On 17 August 1998, Peker was brought to Turkey of his own free will and surrendered to the authorities. The case against him was opened in September 1998. He pleaded guilty to the crimes for which he was accused and was found guilty of building a criminal organization. During the trial, Peker made some remarks without further explanation: "An older member of parliament sent me an SMS which said I shouldn't behave too arrogantly. I would like to tell you (the court) everything, because if I don't it could come to pass that I commit suicide under suspicious circumstances." The prosecutors requested at least 7½ years' imprisonment, but Peker was only sentenced to eight months and 29 days. He was released on 24 May 1999.

On 12 May 2005, he was arrested during Operation Butterfly. On 31 January 2007, he was found guilty of building and leading a criminal organization, robbery, forgery, and two counts of false imprisonment, and sentenced to 14 years and five months.

On 30 May 2008, during his incarceration, Peker married his lawyer, Özge Yılmaz.

Peker is allegedly a member of the underground Turkish organization Ergenekon. Veli Küçük said in 2008 that Peker was the "son of a friend." On 5 August 2013, Peker was sentenced to ten years in prison as part of the Ergenekon trials; however, he and the other convicts were released a few months later.

On 13 January 2016, Peker threatened in a well-attended speech that the academics who signed the petition for peace with the Kurdistan Workers' Party (PKK). For this speech he got prosecuted, but acquitted in July 2018.

In early 2020, he went from Turkey to Montenegro, then he left the Balkans to Morocco, and later to the United Arab Emirates.

Whistle-blower
In May 2021, he started a confession video series on YouTube. He accused Tolga Ağar, son of former interior minister Mehmet Ağar, of raping and murdering Kazakh student Yeldana Kaharman. In addition, he alleged Mehmet Ağar's role in the killing of Kutlu Adalı, and alleged Ağar's involvement, along with former Prime Minister Binali Yıldırım's son Erkam, in an international drug trafficking scheme. He later accused SADAT, founded by retired Brigadier General and former presidential advisor Adnan Tanrıverdi, of being involved in the arms shipment to Al-Nusra Front during the Syrian Civil War.

On December 12, 2021, 140journos released a documentary on YouTube featuring him and some prominent journalists and political figures like former Deputy Prime Minister Bülent Arınç of Turkey. The documentary touched on the impact of the deep state in Turkey on the political and judicial system and how Sedat Peker's involvement with the government scandals started.

References

External links 
 Sedat Peker's official Website
 Peker's Pan-turkic Website
 Sedat Peker's YouTube Channel
 ya devlet başa, Documentary featuring Sedat Peker

1970 births
Living people
People from Adapazarı
People convicted in the Ergenekon trials
Pan-Turkists
Turanists
Turkish nationalists
Turkish crime bosses
Turkish expatriates in Germany